Kodad Assembly constituency is a constituency of the Telangana, India. It is one of four constituencies in the Suryapet district. It consists of six mandals. It is part of Nalgonda Lok Sabha constituency.

The current MLA is Bollam Mallaiah Yadav of Telangana Rashtra Samithi, who won by 756 votes in 2018 General elections held on 7 December.

Mandals 
After the recent delimitation, Kodad Assembly Constituency comprises the following Mandals:

Members

Election results

Telangana Legislative Assembly election, 2018

Telangana Legislative Assembly election, 2014

Andhra Pradesh Legislative Assembly election, 2009

See also
 List of constituencies of Telangana Legislative Assembly
 Kodad

References

Assembly constituencies of Telangana
Assembly constituencies of Nalgonda district